Mount Shark is a  mountain summit located in the Spray Valley of Kananaskis Country at the northern tip of the Spray Mountains range. It is situated on the southern boundary of Banff National Park in the Canadian Rockies of Alberta, Canada. Mount Shark in not visible from any road in Banff Park, however, it can be seen from Alberta Highway 742, also known as the Smith-Dorrien/Spray Trail. Mount Shark's nearest higher peak is Mount Smuts,  to the southeast.

Like so many of the mountains in Kananaskis Country, Mount Shark received its name from the persons and ships involved in the 1916 Battle of Jutland, the only major sea battle of the First World War.

History

Mount Shark and Mount Sparrowhawk were designated as sites to host alpine skiing events in Calgary's bid for the 1988 Winter Olympics, however, the venue for the alpine skiing events moved to Nakiska shortly after Calgary was awarded the Games.

Geology

Mount Shark is composed of sedimentary rock laid down during the Precambrian to Jurassic periods. Formed in shallow seas, this sedimentary rock was pushed east and over the top of younger rock during the Laramide orogeny.

Climate

Based on the Köppen climate classification, Mount Shark is located in a subarctic climate with cold, snowy winters, and mild summers. Temperatures can drop below  with wind chill factors below . Precipitation runoff from the mountain drains west into Spray Lakes Reservoir.

See also

 Mountains of Alberta
 Geography of Alberta

References

Gallery

External links
 Mount Shark weather: Mountain Forecast
 Climbing photos by Bob Spirko: Mount Shark

Two-thousanders of Alberta
Canadian Rockies
Alberta's Rockies
Mountains of Banff National Park